Degen's water snake (Crotaphopeltis degeni), also known commonly as Degen's herald snake and the yellow-flanked snake, is a species of snake in the family Colubridae. The species is native to Sub-Saharan Africa.

Etymology
The specific name, degeni, is in honor of Swiss-born Edward J. E. Degen (1852–1922), who collected natural history specimens in Africa, and later worked as a taxidermist at the British Museum (Natural History).

Geographic range
C. degeni is found in Cameroon, Central African Republic, Ethiopia, Kenya, South Sudan, Tanzania, and Uganda.

Habitat

Behavior
C. degeni is semiaquatic and nocturnal. It swims well, and during the day it hides in holes in the ground and in vegetation near water.

Diet
C. degeni preys upon amphibians and perhaps also upon small fishes.

Reproduction
C. degeni is oviparous. Clutch size is six eggs.

References

Further reading
Barbour T, Amaral A (1927). "Studies on African Opidia". Bulletin of the Antivenin Institute of America 1 (1): 25–29. (Crotaphopeltis degeni, new combination, p. 26).
Boulenger GA (1906). "Additions to the Herpetology of British East Africa". Proceedings of the Zoological Society of London 1906 (2): 570–573. (Leptodira degeni, new species, p. 572, figures 97 a-c).
Rasmussen JB (1997). "On two little known African water snakes (Crotaphopeltis degeni and C. barotseensis)". Amphibia-Reptilia 18 (2): 191–206.
Spawls S, Howell K, Hinkel H, Menegon M (2018). Field Guide to East African Reptiles, Second Edition. London: Bloomsbury Natural History. 624 pp. . (Crotaphopeltis degeni, p. 524).

Reptiles described in 1906
Reptiles of Africa
Colubrids
Reptiles of Cameroon
Reptiles of the Central African Republic
Reptiles of Ethiopia
Reptiles of Kenya
Reptiles of South Sudan
Reptiles of Tanzania
Reptiles of Uganda